Saint V is the commonly used name for a holiday for freethinking university students in Brussels, Belgium. It takes place annually on November 20 and commemorates the founding of the Free University of Brussels. The day's long form differs in the two official languages, but both are a reference to Pierre-Théodore Verhaegen, the university's founder, who notably is not a saint and was never canonized; the name was chosen instead to mock the Saint-Nicolas festivities of the rival Catholic University.

Nowadays, the event is organized by the Brussels Student Association and is celebrated by students of both the Université libre de Bruxelles (ULB) and the Vrije Universiteit Brussel (VUB), which officially separated in 1970.

Origins

That morning, 200 of the university's 1400 students, with many freemasons (as Verhaegen was also the founder of the Grand Orient of Belgium), assembled and left a wreath of oak leaves on Verhaegen's tomb.

In following years, the students, with much fanfare and waving the flags of their respective student organizations, would form a long procession to pay homage to Verhaegen at his tomb and a monument in his honour. These celebrations continue to this day, although the students are now generally more concerned with drinking in the streets, and the honouring of Verhaegen is done largely by faculty and leaders of the student organizations and is more formal and official. In the last few years, a revival of the formalities has occurred due to several restrictions imposed by the city council. Students get the day off for the events; no classes are scheduled that day.

Celebrations
Most student groups rent a large transport truck for the occasion, which they decorate in accordance with the year's theme. Each truck has a large number of kegs inside, and some students are designated to serve beer to the others all day, with an all-you-can-drink payment scheme. Many also bring large sound systems which play loud music all day. 2013's Saint-V saw 6000 students and 27 transport trucks take part in the procession.

The students first meet at the Square du Grand Sablon/Grote Zavelsquare in central Brussels, and after several hours, the trucks start to move towards the Brussels Stock Exchange on the Boulevard Anspach/Anspachlaan, Brussels' main boulevard. This takes several hours as well, as the trucks move only at a walking speed and are more often than not stopped due to the students surrounding them and on the road. Beer may not be served while the trucks are in motion. All roads which the procession goes on are closed to other traffic, including the Boulevard Anspach. The students then disperse and reconvene around 9 p.m. at ULB's Solbosch campus, where all the year's decorations are burnt semi-ceremonially. Many alumni come to the university's discothèque on that night, which is normally only open to current students.

After the November 2015 Paris attacks, the city council decided to cancel the event  for the first time since World War II. A large part of the students, however, ignored that ban and proceeded to occupy the traditional starting point of the Square du Grand Sablon only to later continue with the procession on foot. The year after that the City council forbade the use of the transport trucks and limiting the consumption of alcohol to the start- and endpoint, the students responded by throwing flour at each other and passers-bys. The origins of the flour-throwing dates back to a past tradition of the holiday where the students threw eggs, flour and water at the local catholic Bourgeoisie who used to live in and near the Square du Grand Sablon after they repeatedly pleaded with to city council to try and stop the event from happening because they disapproved of the students using the square as their starting point.

In 2019, St V was included in the inventory of the Brussels cultural intangible heritage.

See also

 History of Brussels
 Culture of Belgium
 Ommegang of Brussels
 Meyboom
 Royal Theatre Toone

References

Vrije Universiteit Brussel
Université libre de Bruxelles
Student culture
Belgian folklore
Festivals established in 1888
November observances
Annual events in Brussels